Nilo is both a given name and a surname. Also the Italian, Portuguese and Spanish pronunciation of the Nile river. Notable people with the name include:

Given name:
 Nilo Acuña, professional footballer who played in Uruguay
 Nilo Alcala, Filipino composer, arranger, and singer
 Nilo Carretero, Argentine footballer
 Nilo Cruz, Cuban-American playwright and pedagogue
 Nilo Floody, Chilean modern pentathlete
 Nilo Guimarães, São Toméan businessman and politician
 Nilo Murtinho Braga, Brazilian footballer
 Nilo Peçanha, Brazilian politician
 Nilo Pereira, Brazilian journalist and teacher
 Nilo da Silva, Brazilian modern pentathlete

Surname:
 Joy Nilo, Filipino composer
 Humberto Nilo, director of the University of Chile school of arts
 Prisco Nilo, Filipino meteorologist

See also

 Niño (name)
 Nino (name)